Klerken is a village in Province of West Flanders in Belgium. It forms a part of the commune of in Houthulst. It was first mentioned in a letter by Arnulphus the Elder from 961 and the village's archives survive from as early as 1653.

Notable buildings include the Vredesmolen (a damaged windmill which is a war memorial) and the village's church of St Laurence (Sint-Laurentiuskerk).

Cyriel Barbary, the last surviving Belgian veteran of World War I, was born in Klerken.

External links
 The Beauprez family page with the entire Klerken history.
t Rozenhof
 Gazetteer Entry

Populated places in West Flanders
Houthulst